The Scarlet West is a 1925 American silent historical drama film directed by John G. Adolfi and starring Robert Frazer and Clara Bow. It was distributed by the First National company.

This was an ambitious silent film made by an independent producer about George Armstrong Custer and the Battle of the Little Bighorn. It was filmed on location at Dolores, Colorado.

Cast

Preservation
There are no prints of The Scarlet West surviving, which makes it a lost film. A trailer survives at the Library of Congress.<ref>[trailer] - Catalog of Holding The American Film Institute Collection and The United Artists Collection at The Library of Congress, p. 159, c.1978 by The American Film Institute</ref> Some of the still photography from the production survives and is used in a documentary on local cinematographer Victor Shuler, who was one of four cameramen on the production.

See alsoGeneral Custer at the Little Big Horn (1926)They Died with Their Boots On (1941)Little Big Man (1970)

References

External links

Sample of documentary on Victor Shuler, a cinematographer on The Scarlet West''

1925 films
American silent feature films
First National Pictures films
Films directed by John G. Adolfi
Lost American films
American black-and-white films
American historical drama films
1920s historical drama films
1925 lost films
Lost drama films
1925 drama films
1920s American films
Silent American drama films